Rear Admiral Mohammad Makbul Hossain, NBP, OSP, BCGMS, ndu, psc was a Rear Admiral of  Bangladesh Navy. He was the Assistant Chief of Naval Staff (Operation). He also served as  Director General of Bangladesh Coast Guard.

Early life and education 
Admiral Makbul was born in Tangail District in 1961.

In January 1979 he joined Bangladesh Navy as an Officer Cadet and completed his UT Officer/Basic Course along with sub-specialisation of 5 years duration from Marshal Tito Naval Academy, Split, Yugoslavia. He was commissioned on 01 Aug 1981 in Executive Branch of Bangladesh Navy.

Admiral Makbul attended various courses both at home and abroad. He did specialization on Anti Submarine Warfare from India in 1990 and graduated from Defence Services Command and Staff College, Mirpur, Dhaka in 1994. He completed Defence and Strategic Studies Course from NDU of China in 2012. Admiral Makbul also did Officer's Weapon and Junior Officer's Tactics Course (OW & JTC) in SI&T, Sylhet, Deputy President Course, C++ programming course and also did Crisis Management Course in Hawaii, USA and Transnational Counter Terrorism Course in Washington DC, USA. He obtained MDS (Master in Defence Studies) from National University, Bangladesh. He also attended many seminars and symposium on national and international security matters especially maritime security related both in home and abroad.

Military career 
During his long career in Bangladesh Navy, Admiral Makbul commanded Frigate, Large Patrol Craft, Minesweeper, Patrol Craft, Fast Attack Craft’ Squadrons (both Missile and Torpedo squadrons) and also commanded all Major Bases of Bangladesh Navy. Rear Admiral Makbul also commanded COMCHIT, COMSWADS and Administrative Authority Dhaka. He has served as Principal of Marine Fisheries Academy, Director in NHQ and Director in DGFI and Assistant Chief of Naval Staff (Personnel). He served as Director General of Bangladesh Coast Guard. His last appointment was Assistant Chief of Naval Staff (Operation).

Award 
He was awarded with the Noubahini Padak, Oshamanno Sheba Padak of Navy and Bangladesh Coast Guard Medal (Sheba) by the Government for his outstanding performance and contribution in his long illustrated career.

Personal life 
Admiral Makbul is happily married and has with one son and one daughter. He is a keen golfer.

References 

1961 births
Living people
Bangladeshi Navy admirals
Director Generals of Bangladesh Coast Guard